Epipsilia latens is a moth of the family Noctuidae. It is found in central Europe, northern Spain, the Apennines, northern Iran, Turkey, Armenia and the Caucasus.

Technical description and variation

The wingspan is 33–36 mm. Forewing dingy luteous grey, varying from pale to dark; in pale examples the outer and inner lines are sharply black; stigmata in all cases indistinct; hindwing of female fuscous, of male dull whitish with grey border; the veins and postmedian line grey.

Biology

Adults are on wing from June to September.

Larva yellowish brown; dorsal and subdorsal lines pale, the latter bordered inwardly by a black line thickened
at middle of each segment; lateral line conspicuously black; head yellowish brown, with two dark streaks. The larvae feed on Gramineae species.

Subspecies
Epipsilia latens latens (central Europe, northern Spain)
Epipsilia latens illuminata (Apennines)
Epipsilia latens hyrcana (northern Iran, Turkey, Armenia, Caucasus)

References

External links

Lepiforum.de

Noctuinae
Moths of Europe
Moths of Asia
Moths described in 1809
Taxa named by Jacob Hübner